The African pied hornbill (Lophoceros fasciatus) is a bird of the hornbill family, a family of tropical near-passerine birds found in the Old World.

The African pied hornbill is a common resident breeder in much of equatorial Africa, from The Gambia to western Uganda and northern Angola. This is a bird of mainly forest habitats. The female lays up to four white eggs in a tree hole, which is blocked off during incubation with a cement made of mud, droppings and fruit pulp. There is only one narrow aperture, just big enough for the male to transfer food to the mother and the chicks.

Morphology and subspecies
This is a large bird,  in length. It has mainly black plumage, with white belly and tail tip. The long, curved black and yellow bill has a medium-sized casque. The sexes are similar, but the female has a smaller casque. Immature birds are duller, have a smaller bill, and no casque. The flight is undulating.

L. f. fasciatus: Nigeria (east of Niger River) to Angola, Democratic Republic of the Congo, and Uganda
L. f. semifasciatus: Senegambia to just east of Niger River

Behaviour
The African pied hornbill is omnivorous and eats fruit and insects. It feeds mainly in trees and is attracted to oil palms.

This conspicuous and gregarious bird advertises its presence with its whistling pii-pii-pii-pii- call.

When the chicks and the female are too big to fit in the nest, the mother breaks out and rebuilds the wall. Then both parents feed the chicks.

References

Further reading

 Birds of The Gambia by Barlow, Wacher and Disley, 

African pied hornbill
African pied hornbill
Birds of the African tropical rainforest
Fauna of the Gambia
Fauna of Uganda
African pied hornbill
Taxa named by George Shaw